And The Winner Is  is a British radio comedy program presented by the comedian Matt Lucas. It was first broadcast in 2010 and airs on BBC Radio 2.

Format
The show takes the format of an awards ceremony known as "The Lucases" (named for the host). In each episode, Lucas would announce a category for the awards (something surreal such as "Sexiest British Prime Minister"), then his three guests would put forward their nominations. After a discussion about why their nominations deserved the award, Lucas himself would decide which nomination was most worthy of the prize. At the end of each show a final award (The Lucas of Lucases) would be given to one of the guests, dependent on the category (Worst Behaved, Most Persusavive etc.)

Episodes

Series 1

Winning nominations below are in bold

Episode 1
Broadcast Date: 25 February 2010

Lucas of Lucases (Most Passionate Guest): James Corden

Episode 2
Broadcast Date: 4 March 2010

Lucas of Lucases (Unluckiest Guest): David Schnieder

Episode 3
Broadcast Date: 11 March 2010

Lucas of Lucases (Worst Behaved Guest): Richard Herring
 All three won the award, as Matt had lost weight by both getting divorce and eating less and exercising more

Episode 4
Broadcast Date: 18 March 2010

Lucas of Lucases (Most Argumentative Guest): Jon Richardson

Episode 5
Broadcast Date: 25 March 2010

Lucas of Lucases (Guest with most absurd argument): Scott Capurro
No award given

Episode 6
First Broadcast: 1 April 2010

Lucas of Lucases (Politest Guest): Tom Baker

Series 2

References
BBC Site
And The Winner Is at British Comedy Guide

BBC Radio 2 programmes
BBC Radio comedy programmes